Tommy Heavenly6 is Japanese artist, Tomoko Kawase's third solo studio album, and debut studio album under the name Tommy heavenly6. The album was released August 24, 2005 through DefStar Records. Tommy heavenly6 peaked at #4 on the Oricon albums chart and is certified Gold by the Recording Industry Association of Japan.

Release and Promotion
Kawase debuted the Tommy Heavenly6 character after a televised performance by Tommy 6 where she performed tracks from the album's lead single, "Wait till I Can Dream". The single was then released on July 16, 2003. The album's second single "Hey My Friend" was released one year later on May 26, 2004. The single's A-side was used as the closing theme, and B-side used as the opening theme, for the film version of Kamikaze Girls. The album's final single, "Ready?", was released July 20, 2005.

After over two years since the album's debut single, the album was finally released on August 24, 2005. The album was released in both standard and limited editions. The limited edition pressing came with a bonus promotional DVD, including music videos and "making of" videos.

Track listing

Notes
 The acronym "LCDD" stands for "Like a Candy Day-Dream".

References

External links 
 Tommy heavenly6 Official Site
 Wait Till I Can Dream music video on Niconico

Tomoko Kawase albums
Defstar Records albums
2005 albums